Nicholas Adam Toon (born November 4, 1988) is a former American football wide receiver. He played college football at Wisconsin and was drafted by the New Orleans Saints in the fourth round of the 2012 NFL Draft. He is the son of former New York Jets wide receiver Al Toon.

Early years
Toon attended Middleton High School in Middleton, Wisconsin. He played as a wide receiver for the Middleton Cardinals football team, and was named a first-team All-state selection in 2006 after earning second-team honors as a junior in 2005. He was a two-time, first-team All-area at kick returner. He was named to inaugural All-American Offense-Defense Bowl. He caught 26 passes for 425 yards and six scores as a junior. He served as the team captain in his senior year, leading his team with 51 receptions for 799 yards and 17 returns for 430 yards, totalling 13 touchdowns. Toon also lettered in track & field.

Toon was ranked among the top 30 players in Midwest and earned All-America honors from SuperPrep. He was rated among the top 25 wide receivers nationally and the No. 3 player overall in Wisconsin by Rivals.com.

College career

College statistics

Professional career

New Orleans Saints
Toon was selected by the New Orleans Saints in the fourth round (122nd pick overall) in the 2012 NFL Draft. He was placed on injured reserve before the start of the 2012 season.  He scored his first touchdown on November 30, 2014 on a pass from Drew Brees against the Pittsburgh Steelers.

On September 1, 2015, he was waived/injured by the Saints. After Toon cleared waivers, he was placed on the Saints' injured reserve list. He was waived off the team's injured reserve with an injury settlement on September 8.

During his two seasons with the Saints, he appeared in 16 games, made 21 catches for 283 yards and 1 touchdown.

St. Louis Rams
The St. Louis Rams signed Toon to their practice squad on September 30, 2015. On May 11, 2016, the Rams cut Toon.

References

External links
New Orleans Saints bio
Wisconsin Badgers bio

1988 births
Living people
American football wide receivers
Wisconsin Badgers football players
New Orleans Saints players
St. Louis Rams players
People from Middleton, Wisconsin
Players of American football from Wisconsin